Jamie Anderson is an American/Canadian female singer-songwriter and multi-instrumentalist from Tucson, Arizona, best known as a performer of women's music. She is based in Ottawa, Ontario. Since 1987 she has played her original songs in hundreds of venues in four countries including forty-seven US states. Anderson first began touring the U.S. in 1987, and released her debut album in 1989. She was voted Favorite New Performer by Hot Wire in 1990 and 1991, and played many women's music festivals through the decade of the 1990s through today.

Anderson teaches music on line, YouTube, arts centers, festivals, and her studio.

Anderson's memoir, Drive All Night, was published in 2014. Her second book, An Army of Lovers: Women’s Music of the Seventies and Eighties, was published in 2019. She has written book chapters, articles and CD reviews in Acoustic Guitar, Curve, SingOut! and more.

She is openly lesbian.

Discography
 Closer to Home (Tsunami Records, 1989)
 Center of Balance (Tsunami, 1992)
 A Family of Friends (Tsunami Records, 1993)
 Bad Hair Day (Tsunami, 1993)
 Never Assume (Tsunami, 1995)
 Drive All Night (Tsunami, 1999)
 Listen (Tsunami, 2002)
 A Promise of Light (Tsunami, 2005)
 Three Bridges (Tsunami, 2007)
 Better Than Chocolate (Tsunami, 2010)
 Dare (Tsunami 2013)
 The Truth Appears (Tsunami 2019)
 Songs from Home (Tsunami 2020)

Selected works
 Drive All Night (Bella 2014)
 An Army of Lovers: Women's Music of the Seventies and Eighties (Bella 2019)

References

 "Five words with singer and writer Jamie Anderson" Indy Week. Retrieved 2019-04-03
 Jamie Anderson, Ottawa Grassroots Festival 2019. Retrieved 2019-04-03
 Jamie Anderson, author at Sing Out! Retrieved 2019-0403
 "Blowin' in the Wind: How to write a good protest song" featuring Jamie Anderson, Ottawa Citizen February 17, 2019. Retrieved 2019-04-03

External links
 Official Website

1957 births
American women singer-songwriters
American lesbian musicians
American LGBT singers
American LGBT songwriters
Lesbian singers
Lesbian songwriters
LGBT people from Arizona
Living people
Guitarists from Arizona
Women's music
20th-century American women singers
20th-century American women guitarists
20th-century American LGBT people
21st-century American LGBT people
21st-century American women singers
21st-century American women guitarists
Singer-songwriters from Arizona
American lesbian writers